Naseem Khushi (born 11 August 1982) is a Pakistani-born cricketer who plays for the Oman national cricket team. He made his Twenty20 International (T20I) debut for Oman in the 2017 Desert T20 Challenge against the Netherlands on 15 January 2017.

In January 2018, he was named in Oman's squad for the 2018 ICC World Cricket League Division Two tournament. He made his List A debut for Oman on 15 February 2018. In August 2018, he was named in Oman's squad for the 2018 Asia Cup Qualifier tournament. In September 2019, he was named in Oman's squad for the 2019 ICC T20 World Cup Qualifier tournament. In November 2019, he was named in Oman's squad for the 2019 ACC Emerging Teams Asia Cup in Bangladesh. The following month, he was named in Oman's One Day International (ODI) squad for the 2020 Oman Tri-Nation Series. He made his ODI debut for Oman, against the United Arab Emirates, on 5 January 2020.

In September 2021, he was named in Oman's squad for the 2021 ICC Men's T20 World Cup.

References

External links
 

1982 births
Living people
Omani cricketers
Oman One Day International cricketers
Oman Twenty20 International cricketers
Cricketers from Sialkot
Pakistani emigrants to Oman
Pakistani expatriates in Oman